Ryan Cwach is an American politician and a Democratic member of the South Dakota House of Representatives representing District 18 since January 5, 2018.

Early life and education
Cwach earned his bachelor's degree from the University of South Dakota and his J.D. from the University of Iowa College of Law in 2011.

Elections
In 2018, Cwach ran for the state house and received the highest vote total  with 27.9% of the vote.

References

External links
 Official page at the South Dakota Legislature

Living people
Democratic Party members of the South Dakota House of Representatives
University of South Dakota alumni
University of Iowa College of Law alumni
21st-century American politicians
People from Yankton, South Dakota
Year of birth missing (living people)